Sterner is a surname of Germanic origin. The name may refer to:
E. Donald Sterner (1894–1983), American lumberman and politician from New Jersey
Frederick Sterner (1862–1939), British-born American architect
Jerry Sterner (1938–2001), American playwright
Jonas Sterner (born 2002), German footballer
Mike Sterner, American college football coach in the 1970s
Olof Sterner (1914–1968), Swedish chess master
Phil Sterner (born 1960), American politician from Minnesota; state legislator
Robin Sterner (born 1990), Swedish professional ice hockey player
Ulf Sterner (born 1941), Swedish professional ice hockey player

See also
16209 Sterner, asteroid